Benoît Jarrier (born 1 February 1989) is a French former road and cyclo-cross racing cyclist, who rode professionally between 2012 and 2020, for the Véranda Rideau–Super U and  teams. He rode in the 2014 Tour de France.

Major results

2012
 2nd Tro-Bro Léon
 7th Polynormande
 8th Grand Prix de la Somme
 9th Châteauroux Classic
2014
 2nd Overall Tour de Normandie
1st Stage 6
 3rd Route Adélie
 4th Overall Étoile de Bessèges
 5th Cholet-Pays de Loire
 5th Tro-Bro Léon
2015
 1st Sprints classification Four Days of Dunkirk
 2nd Tro-Bro Léon
 9th Duo Normand (with Armindo Fonseca)
2016
 7th Overall La Tropicale Amissa Bongo
2017
 3rd Grand Prix de la ville de Nogent-sur-Oise
 8th Overall Circuit de la Sarthe
 9th Overall Tour de Normandie
2018
 7th Le Samyn
2019
 8th Overall Tour de Bretagne
 9th Overall Kreiz Breizh Elites

References

External links

1989 births
Living people
French male cyclists
Sportspeople from Le Mans
Cyclists from Pays de la Loire
21st-century French people